The Irwindale Speedway & Event Center (a.k.a. Irwindale Speedway, Irwindale Dragstrip, or "The House of Drift") is a motorsports facility located in Irwindale, California, United States. It opened on March 27, 1999 under the official name Irwindale Speedway. Toyota purchased the naming rights to the facility in 2008, and from that time until 2011 it was also known as the Toyota Speedway at Irwindale.

The speedway features banked, paved 1/2- and 1/3-mile oval tracks and a 1/8-mile drag strip. The property is primarily used for NASCAR races such as ARCA Menards Series West and Whelen All-American Series events. In late 2011, NASCAR announced it was dropping Toyota Speedway from its schedule. The company that managed the track, Irwindale Speedway LLC, filed Chapter 7 bankruptcy on February 13, 2012.

In January 2013, it was announced that the track would be re-opening as the Irwindale Event Center, and would operate as a Whelen All-American Series venue for the 2013 season. For the past decade, the Formula D Championship Series had featured sold out events at the venue.

In 2015, plans were made to demolish Irwindale Speedway and build an outlet mall on the site of the track. On August 9, 2017 it was officially announced that Jim Cohan, CEO of Team 211 Entertainment, who operated the track under the name of Irwindale Event Center, would cease operation.  On December 29, 2017 it was announced that the track would not close in January 2018 as former Irwindale Late Model driver and track champion Tim Huddleston, along with K&N West team owner Bob Bruncatti, took over management of the speedway to have it remain open.

History

1999–2012
Construction began in March 1998 on Irwindale's 6,500 seat grandstand and 1/2 and 1/3 mile ovals.  Irwindale Speedway hoped to fill the void left in the Los Angeles Basin left by the closures of the famed Riverside International Raceway, Ontario Motor Speedway and Saugus Speedway.  The $7-million project was completed March 1999 and held its inaugural races on March 27, 1999. This Race did not get off to a celebratory start. During practice shortly after 2pm an up and coming Oregon driver named Casey Diemert died of head and kneck injuries after hitting the wall and flipping his car from turn 3 to turn 4. Sadly, many didn't know of the death until reading the newspaper the next day as it wasn't even mentioned during the race. 

From 2003 to 2010, the main 1/2-mile oval hosted the NASCAR Toyota All-Star Showdown. In this event, the top 30 drivers in the NASCAR K&N Pro Series and the top 40 drivers in the NASCAR Whelen All-American Series come from their respective regional tours to compete in a "best-of-the-best" race. The races were televised live on the Speed Channel. It was also the home of the Turkey Night Grand Prix race, a Thanksgiving midget car racing tradition in southern California since 1934, when the race debuted at Gilmore Stadium. Among the 2005 participants were Tony Stewart, Jason Leffler, and J. J. Yeley. It was also seen in an episode of Malcolm in the Middle, titled "Stock Car Races", also used in the opening scene of the pilot episode of Fastlane and in Episode 25 of Fear Factor Season 3.

In 2012, Irwindale Speedway LLC, the management group that ran the track, filed for Chapter 7 bankruptcy on the same day track management canceled the 2012 racing season.

In the paperwork filed at the United States Bankruptcy Court, Central District, it shows that Irwindale Speedway LLC owed creditors $331,773.11. The largest amount is $150,000 owed on a personal-injury claim.

Irwindale Speedway LLC owed Nu-Way Industries Inc., the company that owns the property where the track and offices are built, $55,000 in rent.

Irwindale Speedway LLC has two more outstanding personal injury claims with unknown values. There is also a debt of $8,093.51 owed to the city of Irwindale Police Department, $16,379.58 owed to the Golden State Water Company and $1,437.50 owed to the San Gabriel Valley Tribune for advertising.

2013–2017

In late 2012, Jim Cohan, who ran the LA Driving Experience at the track was able to secure funding to re-open the speedway under his management. In September 2013, the property housing the Irwindale Event Center was purchased by Irwindale Outlet Partners, LLC for $22 million. The lease for the Irwindale Event Center continued on a year-by-year basis. In March 2015, plans were made to demolish Irwindale Speedway and replace it with Irwindale Outlet Center, an outlet mall, but the closure has been delayed. The track is currently running the 2017 season. On August 9th, 2017, Cohan made an announcement in an e-mailed statement saying that the track was closing down officially in January 2018.

2018–present

On December 29, 2017, it was announced that the track would not close in January 2018 as former Irwindale Late Model racer and track champion Tim Huddleston took over management of the speedway to have it remain open. In February 2020 Irwindale's famous All-Star Showdown returned to the track following a ten-year hiatus. The track remained open without spectators during the COVID-19 pandemic founding its own streaming service IrwindaleSpeedway.tv operated by Low Budget TV.  In June 2021 fans returned to the track.

Drag strip
The 1/8-mile drag racing strip opened on September 29, 2001. In 2003, in cooperation with local law enforcement, Irwindale Speedway opened its own dragstrip and hosts legal drag races for street-legal cars, trucks, and motorcycles. The dragstrip is proud to extinguish the "nowhere else to go" excuse used by illegal street racers, and local police often hand out flyers to offenders for free entry into drag races at the dragstrip to promote safe racing and has re-opened.

The House of Drift
Since then, it has become the series regular opening round in February and a non championship event in December and has also hosted a round of the domestic series, Formula D. The venue has been expanded to accommodate 15,000 spectators. The circuit is regarded as one of the most popular courses for crowds and drivers despite the unforgiving concrete wall which drivers usually brush through with their rear bumpers. Because of its popularity, the circuit is nicknamed the House of Drift.

Record
The 2003 Guinness Book of World Records lists the fastest-ever top speed of a radio-controlled car as 111 mph (178.63 km/h) set by Cliff Lett of Associated Electrics. Lett, a Team Associated professional driver and one of the designers and developers of the aforementioned RC10, set the record with a heavily modified Associated RC10L3 touring car at Irwindale Speedway on January 13, 2001.

See also
 List of sports venues with the name Toyota
West Coast Stock Car Hall of Fame

References

External links

Motorsport venues in California
NASCAR tracks
Sports venues in Los Angeles County, California
Irwindale, California
NHRA Division 7 drag racing venues
Sports venues completed in 1999
1999 establishments in California